Wolfgang Heinz (born 31 July 1938, Grünstadt) is a German politician of the Free Democratic Party.

References

1938 births
Living people
Free Democratic Party (Germany) politicians
People from Bad Dürkheim (district)
People from the Palatinate (region)
Members of the Landtag of North Rhine-Westphalia